Jack Milton Fields Jr. (born February 3, 1952) is an American businessman and a former Republican member of the United States House of Representatives from a Houston-based district. He served eight terms from 1981 to 1997.

Early life
Fields was born in Humble, a northern suburb of Houston. He graduated from Humble High School in his hometown in 1970. Fields earned both Bachelor of Arts and Juris Doctor degrees from Baptist-affiliated Baylor University and Baylor Law School in Waco, Texas, in 1974 and 1977, respectively. After being admitted to the Texas bar in 1977, Fields worked as a lawyer in private practice and as a vice president of a family-owned business through 1980.

Congressional career

In 1980, at the age of twenty-eight, Fields was elected to the U.S. House on the coattails of President Ronald Reagan's electoral victory. He narrowly defeated 8th District incumbent Bob Eckhardt, a seven-term Democrat, by only 4,900 votes to become the first Republican to represent what is now the 8th in 83 years. After the 1980 census, most of the 8th's more Democratic areas were cut out, and Fields was reelected seven more times without serious difficulty.

When the Republican Party assumed majority control of the House of Representatives in the 1994 elections, Fields was elected chairman of the Subcommittee on Telecommunications and Finance of the House Committee on Commerce. In that role, he was one of the principal authors of the Private Securities Litigation Reform Act, the National Securities Markets Improvement Act of 1996, and the Telecommunications Act of 1996.

1993 special Senate election
In 1993, Fields joined a field of 24 candidates in a special election for the U.S. Senate seat vacated by Lloyd Bentsen, when Bentsen was appointed by U.S. President Bill Clinton as the secretary of the treasury. However, Fields failed to win enough votes to advance to a runoff election.

In the Senate race, Fields divided the anti-abortion vote with fellow U.S. Representative Joe Barton. The Fields-Barton split propelled State Treasurer Kay Bailey Hutchison, who supported the United States Supreme Court Roe v. Wade abortion decision, into the runoff with appointed incumbent Democratic Senator Robert Krueger. Two former governors divided their support between Fields and Barton. John B. Connally Jr. supported Fields, in part because Connally was from Houston.  Bill Clements endorsed Barton, whose home in Ennis is not far from Clements' home in Dallas.

Post-congressional career
Fields did not run for reelection to the 106th Congress in 1996. Instead, he started two companies, the 21st Century Group, Inc., a government relations firm based in Washington, D.C., and Texana Global, Inc., an international trade corporation headquartered in Texas. He has served on various corporate and charitable boards. In 2004, the U.S. Post Office in Kingwood was renamed the "Congressman Jack Fields Post Office" in Fields' honor.

He joined Insperity as a director in January 1997. His total compensation for this role in 2009 was $120,746.

Fields is married to Lynn Fields and has two daughters, Jordan and Lexi, and a stepson, Josh Hughes.

References

External links

 
 Congressional discussion of bill to name post office after Fields

1952 births
Living people
People from Houston
People from Humble, Texas
American lawyers
American businesspeople
Baylor University alumni
Baylor Law School alumni
Republican Party members of the United States House of Representatives from Texas
People from Ennis, Texas
Members of Congress who became lobbyists